The Macedonian Evangelical United Church (Makedonska Evangelska Obedineta Crkva) is the Macedonian parish of the Uniting Church in Australia (UCA) located in Preston, a suburb of northern Melbourne, Victoria, Australia. The Methodist Church parish of the UCA was formed during the mid 1970s and links are maintained between Preston church and the Evangelical Methodist Church based in the Balkans.

See also 

 Macedonian Australians
 Protestantism in North Macedonia

References

External links 
Facebook

Uniting churches in Melbourne
Macedonian-Australian culture
Buildings and structures in the City of Darebin